In the 2021–22 season, CR Belouizdad is competing in the Ligue 1 for the 56th season, as well as the Algerian Cup. It is their 33rd consecutive season in the top flight of Algerian football. They competing in Ligue 1 and the Champions League.

Squad list
Players and squad numbers last updated on 20 October 2021.Note: Flags indicate national team as has been defined under FIFA eligibility rules. Players may hold more than one non-FIFA nationality.

Competitions

Overview

{| class="wikitable" style="text-align: center"
|-
!rowspan=2|Competition
!colspan=8|Record
!rowspan=2|Started round
!rowspan=2|Final position / round
!rowspan=2|First match	
!rowspan=2|Last match
|-
!
!
!
!
!
!
!
!
|-
| Ligue 1

|  
| style="background:gold;"| Winners
| 29 October 2021
| 11 June 2022
|-
| Champions League

| Preliminary round
| Quarter-finals
| 12 September 2021
| 23 April 2022
|-
! Total

Ligue 1

League table

Results summary

Results by round

Matches
The league fixtures were announced on 7 October 2021.

Champions League

Qualifying rounds

First round

Second round

Group stage

Group C

Knockout stage

Quarter-finals

Squad information

Playing statistics

|-

|-
! colspan=14 style=background:#dcdcdc; text-align:center| Players transferred out during the season

Goalscorers
Includes all competitive matches. The list is sorted alphabetically by surname when total goals are equal.

Transfers

In

Out

New contracts

Notes

References

2021-22
Algerian football clubs 2021–22 season
2021–22 CAF Champions League participants seasons